Mohamed Kourouma is the name of:

 Mohamed Kourouma (footballer, born 1987), Ivorian footballer
 Mohamed Kourouma (footballer, born 1998), Dutch footballer
 Mohamed Kourouma (soccer), Canadian soccer player